United States v. Robinson, 414 U.S. 218 (1973), was a case in which the United States Supreme Court held that "in the case of a lawful custodial arrest a full search of the person is not only an exception to the warrant requirement of the Fourth Amendment, but is also a reasonable search under that Amendment."

Facts
A Washington D.C. Metropolitan police officer stopped a 1965 Cadillac based on reliable information that the driver's operating license had been revoked. All three occupants exited the car, and the officer arrested the driver, Robinson. (For purposes of the Court's opinion, it was assumed that Robinson's full-custody arrest was valid.) The officer proceeded to search Robinson, and felt a package whose contents the officer could not immediately identify. Upon removing the package—a crumpled cigarette packet—and opening it, the officer discovered "14 gelatin capsules of white powder" that turned out to be heroin.

Issue
Did the officer's search of the defendant violate the Fourth Amendment?

Holding
According to the Court "in the case of a lawful custodial arrest a full search of the person is not only an exception to the warrant requirement of the 4th Amendment, but is also a reasonable search under that Amendment."

See also
Chimel v. California (1969)
Virginia v. Moore (2008)
Arizona v. Gant (2009)
People v. Diaz (2011)

Further reading

External links
 

1973 in United States case law
United States Fourth Amendment case law
United States privacy case law
United States Supreme Court cases of the Burger Court
United States Supreme Court cases